VTI may refer to:

 Virtual TI (Virtual Texas Instruments Calculator)
 The Vanguard Group Total Stock Market ETF, an exchange-traded fund with ticker symbol VTI
 Velocity time integral, a measurement in echocardiography
 Vermeer Technologies, original developer of Microsoft FrontPage
 Volda TI, Norwegian sports club
 VTI trademark by VLSI Technology
 Video Terminal Interface (VTI), a video display interface of the polymorphic Poly-88
 Virtual Tunnel Interface, another method for route-based IPsec; see VyOS
 VTI Engine ("Variable valve lift and Timing Injection"), engine developed by PSA Peugeot Citroën and BMW
 Swedish National Road and Transport Research Institute, a transport research institute in Sweden